is a Japanese media franchise created by Bandai, Shogakukan, Studio Gallop, and Toei Animation. It consists of a toy line that started releasing on March 17, 2018, a Nintendo 3DS game, a manga series and an anime television series.

Characters

Media

Anime
An anime television series by Toei Animation and Studio Gallop aired from October 2, 2018. The opening theme is "Bakutsuri Soul", performed by SymaG and the ending theme is "Yūjō ZABOOOON!!", performed by Mikako Komatsu.

Manga
A manga series has been serialized in Shogakukan's CoroCoro Comic since March 15, 2018.

Video game
A Nintendo 3DS game was released in March 2018. It consists of a barcode camera and a fishing reel accessory called a Bakutsuri Bar Rod. The game itself is a free download from the Nintendo eShop. The player uses the barcode camera on a barcode to open a fishing spot, which allows them to fish for "bar soul" lifeforms.

References

External links
 
 

2018 video games
Bandai Namco games
Bandai Namco franchises
Children's manga
Anime television series based on video games
Fishing video games
Gallop (studio)
Japan-exclusive video games
Mass media franchises
Nintendo 3DS eShop games
Nintendo 3DS games
Nintendo 3DS-only games
Shogakukan franchises
Shogakukan manga
Toei Animation television
TV Tokyo original programming
Video games developed in Japan